The Video Collection is the first commercially released greatest videos compilation by singer-actress Cher. It was released by Geffen Records only in the UK c. 1993 and Brazil in 1994 by BMG Record to promote Cher's first European compilation Greatest Hits: 1965-1992.

Formats 
The Video Collection was initially released on VHS in 1993 and in Laserdisc in Germany. It also contains several music videos that are absent from Cher's subsequent music video compilation on videocassette.

Track listing 
 "The Shoop Shoop Song" (alternative version)
 "If I Could Turn Back Time"
 "Save Up All Your Tears"
 "Love and Understanding"
 "Heart of Stone (director's cut)
 "Main Man"
 "We All Sleep Alone"
 "I Found Someone"
 "Dead Ringer for Love"
 "Many Rivers to Cross" (live from The Mirage)
 "I Got You Babe" (with Sonny on Top of Pops)

Promotional video 
In 1993, the live performance of "Many Rivers to Cross" was released as a limited edition VHS Single by MCA.

External links
 VHS cover and tracklist

See also 
 Cher: Music video and DVD videography

Cher video albums
1993 video albums
Music video compilation albums
1993 compilation albums